Dobrowoda may refer to the following places:
Dobrowoda, Białystok County in Podlaskie Voivodeship (north-east Poland)
Dobrowoda, Hajnówka County in Podlaskie Voivodeship (north-east Poland)
Dobrowoda, Świętokrzyskie Voivodeship (south-central Poland)